The Kentucky meat shower was an incident occurring for a period of several minutes between 11 a.m. and 12 p.m. on March 3, 1876, where what appeared to be chunks of red meat measuring approximately , with at least one being , fell from the sky in a  area near Olympia Springs in Bath County, Kentucky. There exist several explanations as to how this occurred and what the "meat" was, the most popular being the vulture theory, in which a group of vultures regurgitated their meals after being startled into taking flight. The exact type of meat was never identified, although various reports suggested it was beef, lamb, deer, bear, horse, or even human.

Incident
At the time, a farmer’s wife Mrs. Crouch was making soap on her porch when she reported seeing the meat pieces fall from the sky. She said she was 40 steps from her house when the meat started to slap the ground. The meat looked gristly, according to Mrs. Crouch. She and her husband believed the event signified a sign from God. A similar event was later reported in Europe. The phenomenon was reported by Scientific American, The New York Times, and several other publications at the time.

The meat appeared to be beef, but according to the first report in Scientific American, two men who tasted it judged it to be lamb or deer. Writing in the Sanitarian, Leopold Brandeis identified the substance as Nostoc, a type of cyanobacteria. Brandeis gave the meat sample to the Newark Scientific Association for further analysis, leading to a letter from Dr. Allan McLane Hamilton appearing in the Medical Record and stating the meat had been identified as lung tissue from either a horse or a human infant, "the structure of the organ in these two cases being almost identical." The composition of this sample was backed up by further analysis, with two samples of the meat being identified as lung tissue, three as muscle, and two as cartilage.

Brandeis's Nostoc theory relied on the fact that Nostoc expands into a clear jelly-like mass when rain falls on it, often giving the sense that it was falling with the rain. Charles Fort noted in his first book, The Book of the Damned, that there had been no rain. Locals favored the explanation that the meat was vomited up by buzzards, "who, as is their custom, seeing one of their companions disgorge himself, immediately followed suit." Dr. Lewis D. Kastenbine presented this theory in the contemporaneous Louisville Medical News as the best explanation of the variety of meat. Vultures vomit as part of making a quick escape and also as a defensive method when threatened. Fort explained the flattened, dry appearance of the meat chunks as the result of pressure, and noted that nine days later, on March 12, 1876, red "corpuscles" with a "vegetable" appearance fell over London.

References

External links 
 
 
 Kentucky Meat Shower is the topic for a 2014 episode of the American History comedy podcast The Dollop

1876 in Kentucky
Bath County, Kentucky
Earth mysteries
History of Kentucky
Anomalous weather
Meat